Shin Ki-ha (Hanja: 辛基夏, RR: Sin Gi-ha, M-R: Sin Kiha; April 27, 1941 – August 6, 1997), was a South Korean politician. A four-term lawmaker, he was a former parliamentary leader of the South Korean political party National Congress for New Politics.

Early life and education
Shin was born in April 1941 in what is now Hampyeong County, South Korea, when Korea was under Japanese rule. He attended Chonnam National University.

Personal life 
Shin had two sons.

Death
On August 5, 1997 Shin, his wife, and around 20 to 24 party members boarded Korean Air Flight 801 from Seoul to Guam. On August 6, 1997 the aircraft hit the ground while attempting a landing at Antonio B. Won Pat International Airport. Shin, dozens of members of his political party, and his wife, died in the crash.

References

Victims of aviation accidents or incidents in the United States
1941 births
1997 deaths
Democratic Party (South Korea, 2000) politicians
Accidental deaths in Guam
Members of the National Assembly (South Korea)